Short Message Service (SMS) language, textism, or textese is the abbreviated language and slang commonly used in the late 1990s and early 2000s with mobile phone text messaging, and occasionally through Internet-based communication such as email and instant messaging.

Features of early mobile phone messaging encouraged users to use abbreviations. 2G technology made text entry difficult, requiring multiple key presses on a small keypad to generate each letter, and messages were generally limited to 160 characters (or 1280 bits). Additionally, SMS language made text messages quicker to compose, while also avoiding additional charges from mobile network providers for lengthy messages exceeding 160 characters.

History
SMS language is similar to telegraphs' language where charges were by the word. It seeks to use the fewest letters to produce ultra-concise words and sentiments in dealing with the space, time, and cost constraints of text messaging. It follows from how early SMS permitted only 160 characters and that carriers began charging a small fee for each message sent (and sometimes received). Together with the difficulty and inefficiency in creating messages, it led the desire for a more economical language for the new medium.

SMS language also shares some of these characteristics with Internet slang and Telex speak, as it evolved alongside the use of shorthand in Internet chat rooms. Likewise, such a change sought to accommodate the small number of characters allowed per message, and to increase convenience for the time-consuming and often small keyboards on mobile phones. Similar elliptical styles of writing can be traced to the days of telegraphese 120 years back, when telegraph operators were reported to use abbreviations similar to modern text when chatting amongst themselves in between the sending of official messages. Faramerz Dabhoiwala wrote in The Guardian in 2016: "modern usages that horrify linguistic purists in fact have deep historical roots. 'OMG' was used by a septuagenarian naval hero, admiral of the fleet John Fisher, 1st Baron Fisher in a letter to Winston Churchill, in 1917".

In general, SMS language thus permits the sender to type less and communicate more quickly than one could without such shortcuts. One example is the use of "tmr" instead of "tomorrow". Nevertheless, there are no standard rules for the creation and use of SMS languages. Any word may be shortened (for example, "text" to "txt"). Words can also be combined with numbers to make them shorter (for example, "later" to "l8r"), using the numeral "8" for its homophonic quality.

SMS language as a multilingual entity

Some may view SMS language to be a dialect of the English language, that is a dialect strongly if not completely derivative of the English language. This may not be so. Such generalization may have risen from the fact
that mobile phones had only been able to support a limited number of default languages in the early stages of its conception and distribution.

A mobile operating system (OS) such as Symbian and language packs enable the linguistic localization of products that are equipped with such interfaces, where the current Symbian release (Symbian Belle) supports the scripts and orthographies of over 48 languages and dialects, though such provisions are by no means fully comprehensive as to the languages used by users all over the world. Researcher Mohammad Shirali-Shahreza (2007) further observes that mobile phone producers offer support "of local language of the country" within which their phone sets are to be distributed.

Nevertheless, various factors contribute as additional constraints to the use of non-English languages and scripts in SMS. This motivates the anglicization of such languages, especially those using non-Latin orthographies (i.e. not using Latin alphabets) following for instance, the even more limited message lengths involved when using for example, Cyrillic or Greek letters. On the other side, researcher Gillian Perrett observes the de-anglicization of the English language following its use and incorporation into non-English linguistic contexts.

As such, on top of the measures taken to minimize space, time and cost constraints in SMS language, further constraints upon the varied nature and characteristics of languages worldwide add to the distinct properties and style of SMS language(s).

Linguistic properties and style

The primary motivation for the creation and use of SMS language was to convey a comprehensible message using the fewest characters possible. This was for two reasons: first of all, telecommunication companies limited the number of characters per SMS and charged the user per SMS sent. To keep costs down, users had to find a way of being concise while still communicating the desired message. Secondly, typing on a phone is normally slower than with a keyboard, and capitalization is even slower. As a result, punctuation, grammar, and capitalization are largely ignored.

The advent of touchscreen phones with large screens, swipe-based input methods and increasingly advanced autocomplete and spelling suggestion functionality, as well as the increasing popularity of free-to-use instant messaging systems like WhatsApp over pay-per-message SMS has decreased the need to use SMS language.  However, various textspeak abbreviations remain common.

Observations and classifications as to the linguistic and stylistic properties of SMS language have been made and proposed by Crispin Thurlow, López Rúa, and David Crystal. Although they are by no means exhaustive, some of these properties involve the use of:
 Initializations (acronyms and abbreviations composed of initials)
 Reductions and shortenings, and omission of parts of speech
Pragmatics and context in interpretation of ambiguous shortenings
 Reactive tokens
 Pictograms and logograms (rebus abbreviation)
 Paralinguistic and prosodic features
Capitalization
Emoticons
 Variations in spelling
 Punctuation, or lack thereof

Initializations (acronyms and abbreviations composed of initials)

There are many examples of words or phrases that share the same abbreviations (e.g., lol could mean laugh out loud, lots of love, or little old lady, and cryn could mean crayon or cryin(g)).

Reductions and shortenings, and omission of parts of speech

For words that have no common abbreviation, users most commonly remove the vowels from a word, and the reader is required to interpret a string of consonants by re-adding the vowels (e.g., dictionary becomes dctnry and keyboard becomes kybrd). Omission of words, especially function words (e.g., determiners like "a" and "the") are also employed as part of the effort to overcome time and space constraints.

The advent of predictive text input and smartphones featuring full QWERTY keyboards may contribute to a reduction in the use of shortenings in SMS language.

Pragmatics and context in interpretation of ambiguous shortenings
Recipients may have to interpret the abbreviated words depending on the context in which they are being used. For instance, should someone use ttyl, lol they may mean talk to you later, lots of love as opposed to talk to you later, laugh out loud. In another instance, if someone were to use omg, lol they may mean oh my god, laugh out loud as opposed to oh my god, lots of love.

Therefore, context is crucial when interpreting , and it is precisely this shortfall that critics cite as a reason not to use it (although the English language in general, like many other languages, has many words that have different meanings in different contexts).

SMS language does not always obey or follow standard grammar, and additionally the words used are not usually found in standard dictionaries or recognized by language academies.

Reactive tokens
The feature of "reactive tokens" that is ubiquitous in Internet Relay Chat (IRC), is also commonly found in SMS language. Reactive tokens include phrases or words like "yeah I know", which signifies a reaction to a previous message. In SMS language, however, the difference is that many words are shortened unlike in spoken speech.

Pictograms and logograms (rebus abbreviation)

Some tokens of the SMS language can be likened to a rebus, using pictures and single letters or numbers to represent whole words (e.g., "i <3 u", which uses the pictogram of a heart for love, and the letter u replaces you).

The dialect has a few hieroglyphs (codes comprehensible to initiates) and a range of face symbols.

Paralinguistic and prosodic features
Prosodic features in SMS language aim to provide added semantic and syntactic information and context from which recipients can use to deduce a more contextually relevant and accurate interpretation. These may aim to convey the textual equivalent of verbal prosodic features such as facial expression and tone of voice. Indeed, even though SMS language exists in the format of written text, it closely resembles normal speech in that it does not have a complicated structure and that its meaning is greatly contextualised.

Capitalization
In the case of capitalization in SMS language, there are three scenarios:
 No capitalization
 Capitalization of only the first word
 Full capitalization as appropriate that conforms to all grammatical rules

Most SMS messages have done away with capitalization. Use of capitalizations on the first word of a message may in fact, not be intentional, and may likely be due to the default capitalization setting of devices. Capitalization too may encode prosodic elements, where copious use may signify the textual equivalent of raised voice to indicate heightened emotion.

Emoji, asterisk emoting, and emoticons

Just as body language and facial expressions can alter how speech is perceived, emoji and emoticons can alter the meaning of a text message, the difference being that the real tone of the SMS sender is less easily discerned merely by the emoticon. Using a smiling face can be perceived as being sarcastic rather than happy, thus the reader has to decide which it is by looking at the whole message.

Use of punctuation and capitalization to form emoticons distracts from the more traditional function of such features and symbols. Nevertheless, uses do differ across individuals and cultures. For example, overpunctuation may simply be used to communicate paralinguistic aspects of communication without the need to create an emotion from it like so: "Hello!!!!".

Punctuation, or lack thereof
While vowels and punctuation of words in SMS language are generally omitted, David Crystal observes that apostrophes occur unusually frequently. He cites an American study of 544 messages, where the occurrence of apostrophes in SMS language is approximately 35 percent. This is unexpected, seeing that it is a hassle to input an apostrophe in a text message with the multiple steps involved. The use of apostrophes cannot be attributed to users attempting to disambiguate words that might otherwise be misunderstood without it.

There are few cases in English where leaving out the apostrophe causes misunderstanding of the message. For example, "we're" without the apostrophe could be misread as "were". Even so, these are mostly understood correctly despite being ambiguous, as readers can rely on other cues such as part of sentence and context where the word appears to decide what the word should be. For many other words like "Im" and "Shes", there is no ambiguity. Since users don't need to use apostrophes to ensure that their message is understood accurately, this phenomenon may in part be attributed to texters wanting to maintain clarity so that the message can be more easily understood in a shorter amount of time. The widespread mobile phone auto-correct feature contributes to the frequency of the apostrophe in SMS messages, since, even without user awareness, it will insert an apostrophe in many common words, such as "I'm", "I'll", and "I'd".

Tone

Variations in spelling
Users may also use spellings that reflect their illocutionary force and intention rather than using the standard spelling. For example, the use of "haha" to signify "standard" laughter, and "muahaha" to encode perhaps more raucous or evil sound of laughter.

In this, regional variations in spelling can also be observed. As such, SMS language, with its intergroup variations, also serves as an identity marker.

Conventional examples and vocabulary

===SMS dictionaries===
SMS language has yet to be accepted as a conventional and stable form, either as a dialect or as a language. As a result, (as much as it is also a consequence), notable lexicographical efforts and publications (e.g., dictionaries) dealing specifically with SMS language have yet to emerge. Some experts have suggested that the usage of "ungrammatical" text message slang has enabled SMS to become a part of "normal language" for many children.

Many informal attempts at documenting SMS have been done. For example, service provider Vodacom provides its clients with an SMS dictionary as a supplement to their cell phone purchase. Vodacom provides lists of abbreviations and acronyms with their meanings in its web site.

Many other efforts have been made to provide SMS dictionaries on the Internet. Usually an alphabetical list of "words" used in SMS language is provided, along with their intended meanings. Text messages can also be "translated" to standard language on certain web sites as well, although the "translations" are not always universally accepted.

Whole word or phrase abbreviation 
Many people are likely to use these abbreviations in lower case letters.

Political abbreviations 
Abbreviations used in politics across the globe, many of the abbreviations are followed by a country code of Alpha-2 code of ISO 3166-1 to specify the country, territory or jurisdiction.

United States

United Kingdom

The Czech Republic 

Czech abbreviations ending with the CZ are pronounced as check

A single letter or digit can replace a word, syllable, or phoneme

Entire sounds within words would often be replaced by a letter or digit that would produce a similar sound when read by itself:

Combinations can shorten single or multiple words:

Overall observations and criticisms

Frequency of use
In one American study, researchers found that less than 20% of messages used SMS language. Looking at his own texting history, the study's author, linguist David Crystal, said that just 10% of his messages used SMS language.

Positive

Effect on verbal language use and literacy
According to research done by Dr. Nenagh Kemp of University of Tasmania, the evolution of textese is inherently coupled to a strong grasp of grammar and phonetics.

David Crystal has countered the claims that SMS has a deleterious effect on language with numerous scholarly studies. The findings are summarized in his book Txtng: the Gr8 Db8.
In his book, Crystal argues that:
 In a typical text message, words are not abbreviated as frequently as widely thought
 Abbreviating has been in use for a long time, and thus is not a novel phenomenon only found in SMS language. Furthermore, some words such as "sonar" and "laser" that are accepted as standard words in the dictionary are originally acronyms.
 Both children and adults use SMS language, so if adults do not display the errors seen in children's written work, they cannot be attributed to SMS language alone.
 Use of abbreviations in written work and examinations is not that prevalent among students.
 A prerequisite to using SMS language is the knowledge of spelling, so use of SMS language does not necessarily imply low literacy.

He further observes that this is by no means a cause for bad spelling, where in fact, texting may lead to an improvement in the literacy of the user.

There are others who feel that the claims of SMS language being detrimental to English language proficiency are overrated. A study of the written work of 100 students by Freudenberg found that the actual amount of use of SMS language found in the written work was not very significant. Some features of SMS language such as the use of emoticons was not observed in any of the written work by the students. Of all the errors found, quite a substantial amount cannot be attributed to use of SMS language. These included errors that have already appeared even before the advent of SMS language.

There are also views that SMS language has little or no effect on grammar. Proponents of this view feel that SMS language is merely another language, and since learning a new language does not affect students' proficiency in English grammar, it cannot be said that SMS language can affect their grammar. With proper instruction, students should be able to distinguish between slang, SMS language and correct English and use them in their appropriate contexts.

Efficiency
According to a study, though SMS language is faster to write, more time is needed to read it compared to conventional English.

Negative

Effect on verbal language use and communication
Although various other research supports the use of SMS language, the popular notion that text messaging is damaging to the linguistic development of young people persists and many view it as a corruption of the standard form of language.

Welsh journalist and television reporter John Humphrys has criticized SMS language as "wrecking our language". The author cites ambiguity as one problem posed, illustrating with examples such as "lol", which may either be interpreted to mean "laughing out loud", "lots of love", and "little old lady" depending on the context in which it is being used. Ambiguous words and statements have always been present within languages. In English for example, the word "duck" can have more than one meaning. It could be referring to either the bird or the action, and such words are usually disambiguated by looking at the context in which it was written.

The proliferation of SMS language has been criticized for causing the deterioration of English language proficiency and its rich heritage. Opponents of SMS language feel that it undermines the properties of the English language that have lasted throughout its long history. Furthermore, words within the SMS language that are very similar to their English-language counterparts can be confused by young users as the actual English spelling and can therefore increase the prevalence of spelling mistakes.

Use in schoolwork
Use of SMS language in schools tended to be seen as negative effects. There have been some reports in the media of children using SMS language for essays in school. The New Zealand Qualifications Authority refuted press reports that they had authorized the use of text abbreviations in exam answers, with a spokesperson saying that "there had been no change to guidelines and there was no specific policy about text language."

A study performed by Cingel & Sundar (2012) investigated the relationship between the use of SMS language and grammar in adolescents. By using a self-report survey where the 228 middle school participants would answer questions regarding their texting behaviors, as well as a ten minute in-class grammar assessment, the study gathered information on how the amount of time a student spent online affected their writing. Cingel & Sundar (2012) hypothesized that the more text messages a student received and sent, the more grammar ‘adaptations’ their writing would contain. The results reflected a negative relationship between text messaging and adolescent grammar skills. They concluded that the more time the youth spend on technology, the more they become acquainted with “techspeak” or “textese,” and thus allow their approach to grammar and academic writing to change.

SMS language and identity
According to Sean Ó Cadhain, abbreviations and acronyms elicits a sense of group identity as users must be familiar with the lingo of their group to be able to comprehend the SMS language used within the group. The ability to use and understand these language short forms that are unique to each group indicates that an individual is part of the group, forging a group identity that excludes outsiders. SMS language is thus thought to be the "secret code of the youth" by some. The fact that sometimes, shortened forms are used for reasons other than space constraints can be seen as interlocutors trying to establish solidarity with each other.

Differences between male and female use of SMS language
According to Norwegian researcher Richard Ling, there are differences in the SMS language of females and males. The lexical, morphological and syntactic choices of male and female SMS users suggested to Ling that women are more "adroit" and more "literary" texters.
Richard Ling observes:
 Women's messages tend to be "longer"
 Women used more "complex structure" and grammar
 Men's messages tend to comprise "one-sentence", "one-clause" or "one-thought" constructions (the latter is markedly observable among male users within the ages 16 to 19)
 More greetings and words of parting were observed in women's messages
 Women had messages with emotional and practical (e.g., arranging a meeting) content unlike men, who mostly used SMS language for practical content only.
 Women and the younger users (across gender) tend to use more shortened forms and emoticons than men per se
 While women observed conventional rules more than men, the difference is marginal. This involves the use of correct spelling, punctuation, capitalization, etc.

Use in advertisements
Circa 2005, advertisements have been increasingly influenced by SMS language. The longer the message in the advertisement, the less the impression it will leave. Hence, short messages that are more catchy, cost and space-saving are more commonly used. The visual effect elicited by SMS language also lends a feeling of novelty that helps to make the advertisement more memorable. For example, an advertisement of a book uses the SMS language: EAT RIGHT 4 YOUR TYPE.

Companies focusing on the teen market have the tendency to make use of SMS language in their advertising to capture the attention of their target audience. Since teenagers tend to be the ones using SMS language, they are able to relate to advertisements that use SMS language.
Unilever's advertisement for their novel range of deodorant for teenage girls uses the phrase "OMG! Moments." David Lang, president of the team who created the advertisement commented that they desired to bring across the impression that they identify with youth culture and discourse.

Many other companies like McDonald's have also attempted to pursue the teenage market by using SMS language abbreviations in their commercials. McDonald's in Korea has an online video commercial which concludes with: "r u ready?".

See also
 Internet slang
 Cyberculture
 Leetspeak
 LOL
 Sexting
 Newspeak (Fictional "impoverished" language featured in George Orwell's Nineteen Eighty-Four)
 Cupertino effect (Erroneous replacement of words by spellcheckers)
 Jejemon
 English language spelling reform
 Tironian notes, scribal abbreviations and ligatures (Roman and medieval abbreviations used to save space in manuscripts and epigraphs)

Further reading

References

Notes

External links

 SlangLang Abbreviations – Slang Words: 2,700 abbreviations and their meanings

Internet slang
Mobile phone culture
Online chat
Text messaging